Hesar-e Sorkh or Hesar Sorkh may refer to:

Hesar-e Sorkh, Qom
Hesar-e Sorkh, Fariman, Razavi Khorasan Province
Hesar Sorkh, Nishapur, Razavi Khorasan Province
Hesar-e Sorkh, Torqabeh and Shandiz, Razavi Khorasan Province
Hesar-e Sorkh, Tehran

See also
Sorkh-e Hesar